This is a list of airlines that have an air operator's certificate issued by the Civil Aviation Authority of Botswana.

{|  class="wikitable sortable" style="border: 0; cellpadding: 2; cellspacing: 3;"
|- valign="middle"
! Airline
! Image
! IATA
! ICAO
! Callsign
! Hub airport(s)
! Commenced operations
! class="unsortable"|Notes
|-
|Air Botswana
|
| BP
| BOT
| BOTSWANA
| Sir Seretse Khama International Airport
|1972
|Flag carrier of Botswana
|-
|Blue Sky Airways (Botswana)
|
|
|
|Flying Mission Services
|Sir Seretse Khama International Airport 
|1977
|
|-
|Kalahari Air Services & Charter
|
|
|
|Air Charter Botswana	
|Sir Seretse Khama International Airport 
|1968
|
|-
|Mack Air
|
|
|MKB
|GREENTAIL
|
|
|1994
|-
|Moremi Air
|
|
|
|
|Maun Airport
|1997
|
|-
|Northern Air (Botswana)
|
|
|
|
|
|
| 
|-
|Wilderness Air
|
|
|WLD
|WILDERNESS
|Maun Airport
|1991
|
|-
|Debswana (Botswana)
|
|
|
|
|Sir Seretse Khama International Airport 
|1978
|
|-
|Kavango Air
|
|
|
|
|
|2005
|
|-
|Major Blue Air
|
|
|
|
|Maun Airport
|2010
|
|}

 See also 
List of airlines

References

 
Airlines
Botswana
Airlines
Botswana